This article contains information about the literary events and publications of 1521.

Events
 January 3 – Pope Leo X excommunicates Martin Luther, by the papal bull Decet Romanum Pontificem.
 January 14 – Martin Luther writes to Johann von Staupitz, saying that he has burned the papal bull.
 February 9 – Íñigo López de Mendoza y Zúñiga arrives in Rome to campaign against Erasmus; later in the year he publishes an account of his journey from Spain.
June (probably 29 or 30) – Neacșu's letter, the oldest surviving dateable document written primarily in the Romanian language (in the Romanian Cyrillic alphabet), is approximately dated to this month.
August 13 – Marko Marulić's poem Judita (Judith, written 1501), a landmark in Croatian literature, is printed in Venice by Guglielmo da Fontaneto.

unknown date – John Siberch is active in Cambridge, the city's earliest known printer.

New books

Prose
Codex Ňuu Tnoo - Ndisi Nuu
Jacopo Berengario da Carpi – Commentaria cum amplissimus additionibus super anatomiam Mundini (published in Bologna), containing the first printed anatomical illustrations taken from nature
Goražde Psalter
Henry VIII of England – Defence of the Seven Sacraments (Assertio Septem Sacramentorum)
Niccolò Machiavelli – The Art of War (Dell'arte della guerra)
Piri Reis – Kitab-ı Bahriye

Poetry

Alexander Barclay – The Boke of Codrus and Mynalcas, the author's "Fourth Eclog"
Henry Bradshaw – The Life of St. Werburgh
Andrew Chertsey, The Passyon of Oure Lorde, translated from French with additional verses inserted and introductory poem by Robert Copland (published in London by Wynkyn de Worde)
Christmas Carols, including "A caroll of huntynge" and "A carol bringyng in the bores heed"
Robert Copland – Introductory verse to The Myrrour & the Chyrche (published in London by Wynkyn de Worde)

Approximate year
 (A Book of a Ghostly Father, published in London by Wynkyn de Worde)
John Skelton, "The Tunnyng of Elynour Rummyng"

Births
May 8 – Peter Canisius, German theologian (died 1597)
unknown dates
Sir Thomas Chaloner the elder, English statesman and poet (died 1565)
Xu Wei (徐渭), Chinese painter, poet and dramatist (died 1593)
probable
Anne Askew, English poet and Protestant martyr (burned at the stake 1546)
Jorge de Montemor, Portuguese novelist and poet writing in Spanish (died 1561)
Pontus de Tyard, French poet and priest, a member of La Pléiade (died 1605)

Deaths
May 10 – Sebastian Brant, German satirical poet and humanist (born c. 1457)
unknown date– Jean Bourdichon, French illuminator of manuscripts (born 1457/9)

References

1521

1521 books
Years of the 16th century in literature